Bahawalnagar–Fort Abbas Branch Line was one of several branch lines in Pakistan, operated and maintained by Pakistan Railways. The line began at Bahawalnagar Junction and ended at Fort Abbas.

History
The branch line was initially referred to as the Bahawalnagar-Fort Abbas Railway and was a Darbar line financed by the Princely Bahawalpur State. The line opened in 1928 as part of the North Western State Railway network. The line was owned by the Bahawalpur State Darbar, who also owned the Khanpur–Chachran Railway, and formed an important part of the NWR network. Following Pakistan's independence, the line became part of the Pakistan Railways network.

Stations
 Bahawalnagar Junction
 Haroonabad
 Faqirwali
 Fort Abbas

See also
 Samasata-Amruka Branch Line
 Mandra–Bhaun Railway
 Karachi–Peshawar Railway Line
 Railway lines in Pakistan

References

Closed railway lines in Pakistan
Railway lines opened in 1928
Railway lines closed in 2011
Railway stations on Bahawalnagar–Fort Abbas Branch Line